Llongo (romanized: Lóggos) is a village in Gjirokastër County, southern Albania. At the 2015 local government reform it became part of the municipality of Dropull. It is inhabited solely by Greeks.

Demographics 
The village had 476 inhabitants in 1993, all ethnically Greeks.

References

External links 
Video and photo compilation of the village

Villages in Gjirokastër County
Greek communities in Albania